The men's Greco-Roman lightweight competition at the 1964 Summer Olympics in Tokyo took place from 16 to 19 October at the Komazawa Gymnasium. Nations were limited to one competitor.

Competition format

This Greco-Roman wrestling competition continued to use the "bad points" elimination system introduced at the 1928 Summer Olympics for Greco-Roman and at the 1932 Summer Olympics for freestyle wrestling, as adjusted at the 1960 Summer Olympics. Each bout awarded 4 points. If the victory was by fall, the winner received 0 and the loser 4. If the victory was by decision, the winner received 1 and the loser 3. If the bout was tied, each wrestler received 2 points. A wrestler who accumulated 6 or more points was eliminated. Rounds continued until there were 3 or fewer uneliminated wrestlers. If only 1 wrestler remained, he received the gold medal. If 2 wrestlers remained, point totals were ignored and they faced each other for gold and silver (if they had already wrestled each other, that result was used). If 3 wrestlers remained, point totals were ignored and a round-robin was held among those 3 to determine medals (with previous head-to-head results, if any, counting for this round-robin).

Results

Round 1

Romero withdrew after his bout.

 Bouts

 Points

Round 2

Two of the wrestlers who had a tie in round 1 lost by fall in this round and were eliminated. Three more were eliminated with a second loss. Each of the remaining 13 men had at least 1 point, with Fujita, Johnsson, and Ivanov in the lead with only 1.

 Bouts

 Points

Round 3

Four wrestlers were eliminated. Ayvaz, with the assistance of a bye, moved up to join Fujita in the lead at 2 points.

 Bouts

 Points

Round 4

Three wrestlers were eliminated, leaving 6 in contention. Ayvaz was now in sole possession of the lead at 3 points. Bularcă and Fujita each had 4; the remaining 3 men had 5.

 Bouts

 Points

Round 5

Five of the six wrestlers were eliminated in round 5, with Ayvaz the only man to stay below 6 points and therefore the gold medalist. The three-way tie for second place necessitated a final round to determine silver, bronze, and 4th.

 Bouts

 Points

Final round

With three wrestlers tied for 2nd place, none of whom had faced each other, there was a final round-robin. Bularcă prevailed in a close contest, defeating Gvantseladze by decision before drawing against Fujita. Gvantseladze took the bronze medal, with one win and one loss. Fujita, with the loss and tie, finished 4th.

 Bouts

 Points

References

Wrestling at the 1964 Summer Olympics